Majitha Assembly constituency (Sl. No.: 13) is a Punjab Legislative Assembly constituency in Amritsar district, Punjab state, India. VVPAT will be used in Majitha in the 2017 Assembly polls.

Members of Legislative Assembly

^ =  (By-elections)

Election results

2022

2017

References

External links
  

Assembly constituencies of Punjab, India
Amritsar district